Harmandia may refer to:
 Harmandia (fly), a genus of flies in the family Cecidomyiidae
 Harmandia (bivalve), a genus in family Unionidae
 Harmandia, a genus of plants in the family Olacaceae with one species Harmandia mekongensis